Pitts Special may refer to:

 Pitts Special (aerobatic biplane)
 Pitts Special (monoplane)
 Pitts Special (roller coaster)